St John the Baptist's Church, Winster is a Grade II listed parish church in the Church of England in Winster, Derbyshire.

History

The tower dates from 1721. Matthew Habershon made alterations in 1840 to 1842, and A Roland Barker started some restoration in 1884. which was completed in 1885. The chancel was demolished and replaced with a larger one, with Minton tiles in the floor. Vestries for the clergy and the choir were constructed. Choir stalls were inserted, a new altar was added and the lighting was improved. The chancel south wall window is by Burne-Jones and was made by Morris and co in 1883.

Parish status

The church is in a joint parish with:
Mission Room, Over Hackney
St Mary the Virgin's Church, South Darley
St Helen's Church, Darley Dale

Organ

The church contains a pipe organ by Abbott. A specification of the organ can be found on the National Pipe Organ Register.

See also
Listed buildings in Winster

References

Church of England church buildings in Derbyshire
Grade II listed churches in Derbyshire